Sigurður Guðmundsson (born in 1942) is an Icelandic photographer.

References

1942 births
Living people
Sigurdur Gudmundsson
Members of the Royal Swedish Academy of Arts